This is a list of seasons completed by the Troy Trojans football program.

FBS records (2001–present)

References

Troy

Troy Trojans football seasons